Langley is a village and civil parish in the Stratford-on-Avon district of Warwickshire, England. In 2011 the parish had a population of 162. The parish touches Bearley Claverdon, Snitterfield, Wolverton and Wootton Wawen.

History 
The name "Langley" means 'Long wood/clearing'. Langley was recorded in the Domesday Book as Longelei. Langley was a township in the parish of Claverdon, it became a separate parish in 1866.

Landmarks 
There are 8 listed buildings in Langley. Langley has a parish church called St Mary's, which is part of the Arden Valley Group of Churches in the Diocese of Coventry.

References 

Villages in Warwickshire
Civil parishes in Warwickshire
Stratford-on-Avon District